In mathematics, the special linear Lie algebra of order n (denoted  or ) is the Lie algebra of  matrices with trace zero and with the Lie bracket . This algebra is well studied and understood, and is often used as a model for the study of other Lie algebras.  The Lie group that it generates is the special linear group.

Applications
The Lie algebra  is central to the study of special relativity, general relativity and supersymmetry: its fundamental representation is the so-called spinor representation, while its adjoint representation generates the Lorentz group SO(3,1) of special relativity.

The algebra  plays an important role in the study of chaos and fractals, as it generates the Möbius group SL(2,R), which describes the automorphisms of the hyperbolic plane, the simplest Riemann surface of negative curvature; by contrast, SL(2,C) describes the automorphisms of the hyperbolic 3-dimensional ball.

Representation theory

Representation theory of sl2ℂ 

The Lie algebra  is a three-dimensional complex Lie algebra. Its defining feature is that it contains a basis  satisfying the commutation relations
It has an explicit realization in terms of two-by-two complex matrices with zero trace:

,
.

Note that, here, the powers , etc. refer to powers as elements of the algebra U and not matrix powers. The first basic fact (that follows from the above commutator relations) is: 

From this lemma, one deduces the following fundamental result:

The first statement is true since either  is zero or has -eigenvalue distinct from the eigenvalues of the others that are nonzero. Thus, for some integer ,  and in particular, by the early lemma,

which implies that . It remains to show  is irreducible.

As a corollary, one deduces:
If  has finite dimension and is irreducible, then -eigenvalue of v is a nonnegative integer  and  has a basis .

The beautiful special case of  shows a general way to find irreducible representations of Lie algebras. Namely, in an irreducible representation, we have a "highest" eigenvector of "h", on which "e" acts by zero. The basis of the irreducible representation is generated by the action of "f" on the highest eigenvectors of "h". See the theorem of the highest weight.

Representation theory of slnℂ 

The Lie algebra can be explicitly realized as a matrix Lie algebra of traceless  matrices.

Set  to be the matrix with one in the  entry and zeroes everywhere else. Then

Furthermore, this is in fact a Cartan–Weyl basis, with the  spanning the Cartan subalgebra.

Notes

References 
 Etingof, Pavel. "Lecture Notes on Representation Theory". 

 A. L. Onishchik, E. B. Vinberg, V. V. Gorbatsevich, Structure of Lie groups and Lie algebras. Lie groups and Lie algebras, III. Encyclopaedia of Mathematical Sciences, 41. Springer-Verlag, Berlin, 1994. iv+248 pp. (A translation of  Current problems in mathematics. Fundamental directions. Vol. 41, Akad. Nauk SSSR, Vsesoyuz. Inst. Nauchn. i Tekhn. Inform., Moscow, 1990. Translation by V. Minachin. Translation edited by A. L. Onishchik and E. B. Vinberg)  
 V. L. Popov, E. B. Vinberg,  Invariant theory. Algebraic geometry. IV. Linear algebraic groups. Encyclopaedia of Mathematical Sciences, 55. Springer-Verlag, Berlin, 1994. vi+284 pp. (A translation of  Algebraic geometry. 4, Akad. Nauk SSSR Vsesoyuz. Inst. Nauchn. i Tekhn. Inform., Moscow, 1989. Translation edited by A. N. Parshin and I. R. Shafarevich) 
.

See also
Affine Weyl group
Finite Coxeter group
Hasse diagram
Linear algebraic group
Nilpotent orbit
Root system
sl2-triple
Weyl group

Lie groups